This is a list of programs that are currently or formerly broadcast on Hum Sitaray. The network reruns serials over and over from Hum TV since 2016.

Currently broadcast

Drama Serials
 Ishq Zahe Naseeb
 Soteli Mamta
 Udaari
 Bin Roye
 Badnaseeb
 Suno Chanda
 Jo Tu Chahey
 Ehd-e-Wafa
 Gul-e-Rana

Reality/Non-Scripted
 The After Moon Show

Formerly broadcast

Original Programming

Comedy
Ghundi
 SHO Batti
 Teen Kahaani
 Zig Zag

Dramas
 100 Din Ki Kahani
 Bhanwar
 Dooriyan
 Khalish
 Lamha
 Madawa
 Miss You Kabhi Kabhi
 Na Dil Deti
 Neelam Kinaray
 Rung
 Pardes
 Phir Se Meri Kismat Likh De
 Pyaar Hai Tu Mera
 Sawaab
 Shehr-e-Tamanna
 Surkh Jorra
Woh Chaar
 Zindagi Tum Ho
 Zameen Pe Chand
 Mujhay Sandal Kar Do
 Ahmed Habib Ki Betiyan
Mera Bhi Koi Ghar Hota
 Sartaj Mera Tu Raaj Mera
 Tera Woh Pyaar
 Bunty I Love You
 Aashti
 Extras: The Mango People
 Madiha Maliha
 Ru Baru
 Anaa
 Main Haar Nahi Manoun Gi
 Jaal
 Meer Abru
 Tera Yahan Koi Nahin
 Natak
 Mr. Shamim
 Joru Ka Ghulam
 Kitni Girhain Baqi Hain
 Tonite with HSY
 Mann Mayal
 Thori Si Wafa

Reality Shows/Talk Shows
 Bridal Couture Week
 Challenger
 Sitaray Ki Subha
 Tonite with HSY

Soap Opera
 Babul Ki Saheliyan
 Chirriyon Ka Chamba
 Faaslon Ke Darmiyaan
 Jahan Ara Begum
 Kuch Rishte Aise Hote Hain

Acquired Programming

India
Ajeeb Daastaan Hai Ye
 Cinestars Ki Khoj
 Jamai Raja
 Udaan
Mission Sapne

Turkey
 Dirilis
 Wadi E Ishq

References

 
Hum Network Limited
Television channels and stations established in 2013
Television stations in Pakistan